The Environmental Seismic Intensity scale (ESI 2007) is a seismic scale used for measuring the intensity of an earthquake on the basis of the effects of the earthquake on the natural environment (Earthquake Environmental Effects).

Overview
The international effort to develop a new scale of macroseismic intensity that would focus exclusively on environmental effects of earthquakes began in the early 1990s and was sponsored by the International Union for Quaternary Research (INQUA). After the final draft of the scale was approved by INQUA at its XVII Congress in Cairns, Australia, in 2007, the scale became officially known as ESI 2007.

Like many other intensity scales, ESI 2007 uses the basic structure of twelve degrees of seismic intensity and is designed for application during field surveys immediately after the seismic event. However, the definitions of intensity degrees in ESI 2007 are based on the observation of distribution and size of environmental effects produced by an earthquake. This approach makes ESI 2007 a unique diagnostic tool for the assessment of seismic intensity levels X to XII in sparsely populated and uninhibited areas where earthquake effects on people and built environment may not be easily observed. For intensity level IX or lower, the ESI 2007 scale is intended to be used as a supplement to other intensity scales.

a) the Definition of intensity degrees on the basis of Earthquake Environmental Effects;

b) the Guidelines, which aim at better clarifying i) the background of the scale and the scientific concepts that support the introduction of such a new macroseismic scale; ii) the procedure to use the scale alone or integrated with damage-based, traditional scales; iii) how the scale is organized; iv) the descriptions of diagnostic features required for intensity assessment, and the meaning of idioms, colors, and fonts.

Since 2007, the scale has been applied to modern, historical and paleoearthquakes in the frame of the INQUA TERPRO Commission on Paleoseismology and Active tectonics. It is now available in ten different languages.

See also

 Other seismic scales

References

Sources
 
 Porfido S., Esposito E., Spiga E., Mazzola S. (2012). Application of the ESI Scale: Case study of the Febr. 4, 1976 Guatemala earthquake. INQUA-IGCP .Proc. Morelia (Mexico), 2012, Vol 3, 147-150
 Porfido, S., Esposito, E., Violante, C., Molisso, F., Sacchi M., Spiga E. (2011) Earthquakes-Induced Environmental Effects in Coastal Area: Some Example in Calabria and Sicily (Southern Italy). In: Brugnoli E., Cavarretta G., Mazzola S., Trincardi F., Ravaioli M., Santoleri R (eds), Marine Research at Cnr,  Volume DTA/06, CNR, 1803-1815
 
Mem. Desc. Carta Geol d’Italia,184 pp., vol. XCVII.
 Porfido S., Esposito E., Guerrieri L., Vittori E., Tranfaglia G., Pece R., 2007. Seismically induced ground effects of the 1805, 1930 and 1980 earthquakes in the Southern Apennines (Italy). Ital .J. Geosci., 126, 2, 333-346.
 Serva L., E. Esposito, L. Guerrieri, S. Porfido, E. Vittori, V. Comerci (2007) Environmental effects from five historical earthquakes in southern Apennines (Italy) and macroseismic intensity assessment: contribution to INQUA EEE Scale Project. Quaternary International, 173–174, 2007, 30-44
 Porfido, Sabina; Alessio, Giuliana; Gaudiosi, Germana; Nappi, Rosa. 2020. "New Perspectives in the Definition/Evaluation of Seismic Hazard through Analysis of the Environmental Effects Induced by Earthquakes" Geosciences 10, no. 2: 58. https://doi.org/10.3390/geosciences10020058
 Nappi, R.; Porfido, S.; Paganini, E.; Vezzoli, L.; Ferrario, M.F.; Gaudiosi, G.; Alessio, G.; Michetti, A.M. The 2017, MD = 4.0, Casamicciola Earthquake: ESI-07 Scale Evaluation and Implications for the Source Model. Geosciences 2021, 11, 44. https://doi.org/10.3390/geosciences11020044
 Caccavale, M.; Sacchi, M.; Spiga, E.; Porfido, S. The 1976 Guatemala Earthquake: ESI Scale and Probabilistic/Deterministic Seismic Hazard Analysis Approaches. Geosciences 2019, 9, 403. https://doi.org/10.3390/geosciences9090403
 Chunga, K.; Livio, F.A.; Martillo, C.; Lara-Saavedra, H.; Ferrario, M.F.; Zevallos, I.; Michetti, A.M. Landslides Triggered by the 2016 Mw 7.8 Pedernales, Ecuador Earthquake: Correlations with ESI-07 Intensity, Lithology, Slope and PGA-h. Geosciences 2019, 9, 371. https://doi.org/10.3390/geosciences9090371

External links
 More info about the ESI intensity scale  
 Definition of intensity degree 
 Guidelines 
 ESI scale translated in ten languages 
 Link to the INQUA TERPRO Commission on Paleoseismology and Active tectonics 

Seismic intensity scales